Senator Conklin may refer to:

James Conklin (politician) (1831–1899), Wisconsin State Senate
Jonathan S. Conklin (1770–1839), New York State Senate
William T. Conklin (1908–1990), New York State Senate